James Norman Karcher (May 2, 1914 – August 19, 1997) was an American football offensive lineman for the Boston/Washington Redskins in the National Football League and the Columbus Bullies in the American Football League, making the AFL All-League team for 1940.  He played college football at Ohio State University.

1914 births
1997 deaths
People from Forest, Ohio
American football offensive guards
Ohio State Buckeyes football players
Boston Redskins players
Washington Redskins players
Columbus Bullies players